Live in Buenos Aires 1979 is a live album by jazz pianist Bill Evans with Marc Johnson and Joe LaBarbera recorded at the Teatro General San Martín, Buenos Aires in 1979.

Reception

Track listing

 "Stella By Starlight" - 7:06
 "Laurie" - 7:55
 "Theme From Mash" - 4:26
 "Turn Out the Stars" - 5:29
 "I Do It For Your Love" - 6:17
 "My Romance" - 7:04
 "Letter To Evan" - 4:24
 "I Love You Porgy" - 7:07
 "Up With The Lark" - 6:49
 "Minha" - 3:52
 "Some Day My Prince Will Come" - 6:20
 If You Could See Me Now - 6:08
 Nardis - 16:45

Personnel
Bill Evans – piano
Marc Johnson – double bass
Joe LaBarbera – drums

References
 https://www.discogs.com/Bill-Evans-Trio-Live-In-Buenos-Aires-1979/release/2495806

Further reading
 
 

Bill Evans live albums
1979 live albums
Live albums recorded in Buenos Aires